Lt. Col. John Nevill Eliot (29 August 1912 – 11 April 2003) was an English entomologist who specialised in Oriental Lepidoptera especially Lycaenidae.

He was born in Woolwich, London and died in Taunton, Somerset.

References

English entomologists
2003 deaths
1912 births
People from Woolwich
20th-century British zoologists